Ilgın is a town and district of Konya Province in the Central Anatolia region of Turkey. According to 2000 census, population of the district is 75,681 of which 26,698 live in the town of Hadim.

Etymology
The name ılgın comes from the former Byzantine name of the city, Lageina.

Notable natives
Famous Turkish folk musician and novelist Zülfü Livaneli was born in Ilgın.

Notes

References

External links
 District governor's official website 
 District municipality's official website  

Populated places in Konya Province
Districts of Konya Province
Lycaonia